Harvard Man is a 2001 American crime comedy-drama thriller film written and directed by James Toback, and starring Adrian Grenier, Sarah Michelle Gellar, Joey Lauren Adams, Rebecca Gayheart, Ray Allen, and Eric Stoltz.

Plot
The story concerns Harvard student Alan Jensen, the point guard of the Harvard basketball team. When his parents' house is destroyed by a tornado, Alan is desperate for $100,000 to replace their home. He is approached by his girlfriend Cindy Bandolini, whose father is an organized crime boss. Cindy convinces Alan to throw a game for the money. She tells Alan that her father is behind the deal, but actually she goes to her father's associate, Teddy Carter, and Carter's assistant, Kelly Morgan for funding. What she does not know is that Carter and Morgan are undercover FBI agents.

Alan throws the game, gives his parents the money, and then undergoes a psychedelic experience after he ingests a big dose of LSD, 15,000 micrograms. There follows a long stretch of the film during which morphing special effects demonstrate Alan's altered state as he is pursued by Carter, while Cindy is collared by Morgan.

Just when it looks like a toss-up as to what will prove his downfall first, the bad trip, the FBI, or the mob, Alan's other girlfriend (who is also his philosophy lecturer), Chesney Cort, saves the day. Not only does she get Alan to a doctor who can bring him back to sobriety, she reveals that she is in a sexual threesome with Carter and Morgan. Once he gets some photographic evidence for blackmail, Alan is extricated from his problems.

The ending implies that he may have hallucinogen persisting perception disorder (a chronic disorder in which a person has flashbacks of visual hallucinations or distortions experienced during a previous hallucinogenic drug experience) this is also known as having acid (LSD) flashbacks. While taking a picture of a boy in the park the boy's face morphs and Alan hears echoes of past conversations when Sandy said "Sometimes it never ends". The little boy consoles Alan telling him "everything's okay". He responds "I hope you're right". A close up is shown of his eyes dilated.

Cast
 Sarah Michelle Gellar as Cindy Bandolini
 Adrian Grenier as Alan Jensen
 Joey Lauren Adams as Chesney Cort
 Eric Stoltz as Teddy Carter
 Rebecca Gayheart as Kelly Morgan
 Gianni Russo as Andrew Bandolini
 Ray Allen as Marcus Blake
 Michael Aparo as Russell
 Scottie Epstein as Mario
 John Neville as Dr. Reese
 Polly Shannon as Juliet
 Phillip Jarrett as Coach Preston
 Al Franken as himself

Music 
The film's original score was composed by Ryan Shore.

Release
Harvard Man had only a limited theatrical release in July 2002, and received little critical or popular acclaim, although it achieved some success when it was released on video and DVD in October of that year.

Critical reception
The film received mixed reviews from critics. On Rotten Tomatoes, the film has a rating of 33%, based on 36 reviews, with an average rating of 4.6/10. The site's critical consensus reads, "Harvard Man is a pretentious, incoherent mess." On Metacritic, which uses an average of critics' reviews, the film has a score of 49 out of 100, based on 20 reviews, indicating "mixed or average reviews".

References

External links
 
 
 
 
 

2001 films
2001 comedy-drama films
2001 independent films
2000s comedy thriller films
2000s crime comedy-drama films
2000s crime thriller films
2000s thriller drama films
American basketball films
American comedy thriller films
American crime comedy-drama films
American crime thriller films
American independent films
American thriller drama films
Films about drugs
Films about the Federal Bureau of Investigation
Films about mental states
Films about organized crime in the United States
Films directed by James Toback
Films set in Boston
Films set in Harvard University
Films shot in Boston
Films shot in Toronto
The Kushner-Locke Company films
Films scored by Ryan Shore
2000s English-language films
2000s American films